The World Bowls Tour Awards are the annual awards ceremony hosted by the World Bowls Tour to recognise the achievements of the bowls players who compete on the World Bowls Tour (WBT). The annual event is usually held in January, which take place just before the World Indoor Bowls Championships begins. The annual World Bowls Tour Hall of Fame induction happens at the annual awards ceremony too, which was launched along with the inaugural World Bowls Tour Awards ceremony in 2008.

Winners

References 

2008 in bowls
Awards established in 2008
British sports trophies and awards
awards
British awards
Sports trophies and awards